Veronica pinguifolia, the disk-leaved hebe or thick-leaved speedwell, is a species of flowering plant in the family Plantaginaceae, native to the South Island of New Zealand. Under its synonym Hebe pinguifolia, its cultivar 'Pagei' has gained the Royal Horticultural Society's Award of Garden Merit.

References

pinguifolia
Endemic flora of New Zealand
Flora of the South Island
Plants described in 1864